Colobothea geminata is a species of beetle in the family Cerambycidae. It was described by Bates in 1865. It is known from French Guiana and Brazil.

References

geminata
Beetles described in 1865